Maulds Meaburn is a village in Cumbria, England. It is located in the Lyvennet Valley and Yorkshire Dales National Park and is 13 miles from Penrith. Its origins are connected with the nearby village King's Meaburn.

Lankaber is a group of farms which is part of Maulds Meaburn. It is not a hamlet in its own right.

History

The name Maulds Meaburn goes back to the 12th century. The King at the time, Henry II, gave part of the lands of Meaburn to Sir Hugh de Morville, and the other part to his sister, Maud de Veteripont. Sir Hugh eventually fell out of favour with the King, after which the King reclaimed Sir Hugh's section of the land, and this area from here on became known as Kings Meaburn. The land that belonged to Maud remains known as called Maulds Meaburn.

The village changed hands over the years and after it was owned by the Veteriponts it passed to the families of Frauncey and then Vernon.

Flass House, on the south side of the village, is a picturesque mansion, built 1851-3 in Italianate style. It was the home of Lancelot Dent who was involved in the opium trade. In 2015, the current owner of Flass House was convicted, along with several other men, of drug offences, where Flass House was used as a 'cannabis farm'.

Geography

The village is situated on either side of the Lyvennet Beck. Maulds Meaburn is part of the Crosby Ravensworth Parish.

Weather and Climate
To view the current weather conditions from the village follow the link. 
Includes full monthly weather reports and a historical look at the weather of the Lyvennet valley.

See also

Listed buildings in Crosby Ravensworth

References

External links
 Cumbria County History Trust: Crosby Ravensworth (nb: provisional research only – see Talk page)

Villages in Cumbria
Crosby Ravensworth